Marshawn or Marshon is a masculine given name. Notable people with the name include:

 MarShon Brooks (born 1989), American basketball player
 Mardy Gilyard (born 1986), American football player
 Marshon Lattimore (born 1996), American football player
 Marshawn Lynch (born 1986), American football player
 Marshawn Powell (born 1990), American basketball player

Masculine given names